Shane McEleney (born 31 January 1991) is an Irish professional footballer who plays as a centre back for League of Ireland Premier Division side Derry City

Playing career

Derry City
McEleney signed his first professional contract under manager Stephen Kenny in 2010. He won 3 trophies with his home town club alongside his brother Patrick McEleney.

Ottawa Fury
In December 2016, McEleney signed with Ottawa Fury FC in the United Soccer League.

Larne
McEleney joined Larne in January 2018 and helped the club to the 2018/19 Championship title, playing on the right of a back three.

Finn Harps
On 10 January 2020, McEleney made a return to the League of Ireland, signing for Finn Harps.

Honours
Derry City
League of Ireland First Division (1): 2010
League of Ireland Cup (1): 2011, 
FAI Cup (1): 2012

St Patrick's Athletic
League of Ireland Cup (2): 2015, 2016

Larne
NIFL Championship (1) 2018/19

References

External links

1991 births
Living people
Republic of Ireland association footballers
Association football defenders
Sportspeople from Derry (city)
Republic of Ireland expatriate association footballers
Expatriate soccer players in Canada
Republic of Ireland international footballers from Northern Ireland
Derry City F.C. players
St Patrick's Athletic F.C. players
Ottawa Fury FC players
Larne F.C. players
Finn Harps F.C. players
League of Ireland players
USL Championship players
NIFL Premiership players